Amerila vitrea is a species of moth of the subfamily Arctiinae. It was described by Carl Plötz in 1880. It is found in Angola, Benin, Burkina Faso, Cameroon, the Republic of the Congo, The Democratic Republic of the Congo, Eritrea, the Gambia, Ghana, Ivory Coast, Kenya, Liberia, Madagascar, Mozambique, Namibia, Nigeria, Rwanda, Senegal, Sierra Leone, Somalia, South Africa, Sudan, Tanzania, Uganda, Zambia and Zimbabwe.

Subspecies
Amerila vitrea vitrea
Amerila vitrea saalmuelleri (Rothschild, 1911) (the Comoros and Madagascar)

References

Moths described in 1880
Amerilini
Moths of Sub-Saharan Africa
Moths of Madagascar
Insects of West Africa
Insects of Angola
Insects of the Republic of the Congo
Insects of Eritrea
Insects of Somalia
Moths of the Comoros